The Pahiatua by-election was a by-election in the New Zealand electorate of Pahiatua, a rural seat at the south-east of the North Island.

The by-election was held on 28 July 1904, and was precipitated by the death of sitting Liberal member of parliament John O'Meara. The election was won by Bill Hawkins who stood as an independent Liberal. Former Wairau MP Lindsay Buick was selected by the government as the official Liberal candidate.

Result
The following table gives the election results:

Notes

Pahiatua, 1904
1904 elections in New Zealand
Politics of Manawatū-Whanganui